There are two arrondissements of Saint-Pierre in France:

Arrondissement of Saint-Pierre, Martinique
Arrondissement of Saint-Pierre, Réunion

ru:Сен-Пьер (значения)